Kharkopar railway station (station code: KR) is a  railway station in Raigad district, Maharashtra. It  serves Kharkopar area of Navi Mumbai. The station consists of two platforms.

Kharkopar railway station currently operational as terminal station.

References

Railway stations in Raigad district
Mumbai CR railway division
Transport in Navi Mumbai
Proposed railway stations in India
Mumbai Suburban Railway stations